Sagñay, officially the Municipality of Sagñay, is a 4th class municipality in the province of Camarines Sur in the Philippines. According to the 2020 census, it has a population of 36,841 people.

Atulayan Island is under the jurisdiction of this municipality.

History

Sagñay was established in the late 17th century by the Spanish friars. Like the town of Lagonoy, Sagñay also formed part of the province of Albay but it was separated in the year 1846 by the order of Governor General Narciso Claveria.

The parish of St. Andrew was founded in the same year that Sagñay gained its independence as a town. The town's annual fiesta is held every November 30, honoring Saint Andrew the Apostle - Town's Patron Saint.

Geography

Barangays

Sagñay is subdivided into 19 barangays.

Climate

Demographics

Economy

Education

Elementary schools
Sagñay has 17 DepEd elementary schools, namely:
 Aniog Elementary School - 112977 - Mountain
 Atulayan Elementary School - 112978 - Coastal
 Bolo Elementary School - 112979 - Mountain
 Bongalon Elementary School - 112980 - Coastal
 Buracan Elementary School - 112981 - Poblacion and Mainland
 Catalotoan Elementary School - 112982 - Mountain
 Kilantaao Elementary School -112983 - Mountain
 Mabca Elementary School - 112984 - Poblacion and Mainland
 Minadongjol Elementary School - 112985 - mountain
 Nato Elementary School - 112985 - Coastal
 Odiongan Elementary School - 112986 - Coastal
 Patitinan Elementary School - 112987 - Coastal
 Quilomaon Elementary School - 112988 - Mountain
 Sagñay Central School - 112989 - Poblacion and Mainland
 Sibaguan Elementary School -112990 - Coastal
 Sto. Niño Elementary School -112991 - Coastal
 Turague Elementary School - 112993 - Coastal

Gallery

References

External links
 
 [ Philippine Standard Geographic Code]

Municipalities of Camarines Sur